Banshee is a 2006 American television drama film directed by Kari Skogland, starring Taryn Manning. Following its TV premiere it had a DVD release in several countries.

Plot 
Sage Ryan, daughter of a demised garage owner, is a professional car thief. The police know her, but have always failed to convict her. Due to her aptitude to elude police she is notorious known as "The Banshee".

One day everything changes when she steals a distinct vintage car (a 66 Dodge Charger) right before a date. Lacking in concentration, she drops her ID card at the crime scene and doesn't even realize the loss.

After she has delivered the car to her fencer she returns home only to find a threatening letter. The owner of the stolen car has kidnapped her lover and demands his car back.

Sage brings the car back to the parking area where she stole it and hopes that her lover will be released in exchange. Instead, she finds in her flat two police officers and her lover's corpse.

The police consider her the number one suspect and try to arrest her. She barely escapes and starts an investigation of her own. Hunted by police and by her furious fencer, she tracks down the murderer, who turns out to be a serial killer.

He has captured and is about to kill Sage's friend Brenna. She manages to save Brenna, only for the two to suddenly have to run for their lives.

Cast
 Taryn Manning as Sage Rion
 Romano Orzari as Eddie Rindall
 Michael Lombardi as Oliver "Fitz" Fitzgerald
 Genelle Williams as Brenna
 Christian Campbell as John Larch
 Tony Calabretta as Mitch Murray
 Morgan Kelly as Tony Romano
 Bronwen Mantel as Mildred Totty
 Nicolas Wright as Jack

Production
Due to the tight schedule Taryn Manning refused to be doubled for the stunts as she later confirmed in an interview.

Reception
New York Post's Linda Stasi considered the film "a new take on chick flicks" but described the story as "flawed". Variety's Laura Fries dismissed the film as "ridiculous, exploitative and downright creepy". David Johnson judged for "DVD Verdict" that  Taryn Manning proved herself "more than capable" of carrying the film but he also objected the script as not completely logical.

References

External links 

 
 
 

2006 television films
2006 films
2006 drama films
Films directed by Kari Skogland